Odyneromyia transparens is a species of hoverfly in the family Syrphidae.

Distribution
Australia.

References

Eristalinae
Insects described in 1955
Diptera of Australasia
Taxa named by Sergey Paramonov (entomologist)